The National University (UNAS) is the oldest private university in Jakarta and the second oldest in Indonesia. It was founded as the National Academy by several Indonesian scholars on October 15, 1949. UNAS has been accredited "A" by the National Accreditation Body for Higher Education (BAN-PT), and also credited by QS Star University Rating, having been awarded 4 stars during the evaluation.

History
UNAS laid its foundation in 1946 by members of the Association for the Advancement of Science and Culture (PMIK). The founders were R. Teguh Suhardjo Sastrosuwingnyo, Mr. Sutan Takdir Alisjahbana, Mr. Soedjono Hardjosoediro, Prof. Sarwono Prawirohardjo, Mr. Prajitno Soewondo, Hazil, Kwari Katjabrata, Prof. Dr. R. M. Djoehana Wiradikarta, R. M. Soebagio, Ny. Noegroho, Drs. Adam Bakhtiar, Dr. Bahder Djohan, Dr. J. Leimena, Ir. Abd Karim, Prof. Dr. Soetomo Tjokronegoro, Mr. Ali Budiharjo, Poerwodarminta, Mr. Soetikno, Ir.TH. A. Resink, DR. Soemitro Djojohadikusumo, Noegroho, Soejatmiko, H.B. Jassin, Mochtar Avin, L. Damais, A.Djoehana, and Nona Roekmini Boediardjo Singgih.

Studies were conducted in 1946 by two committees.

The first committee, in charge of investigating how to invigorate life sciences in Indonesia, had the following members:

 Dr. Leimena
 IR. Abd. Karim
 Prof. Dr. Soetomo Tjokronegoro
 Mr. Ali Budihardjo
 Ir. Th. A. Resink
 Dr. Soemitro Djojohadikusumo

The second committee, in charge of motivating stimulating business activity, consisted of:

 Nugroho
 Soejatmoko
 H.B.Jassin
 Muchtar Avin
 A. Djoehana
 Nona Budihardjo
 Nona Rukmini Singgih

In late 1946 short courses were established. On around October 1949, in response to demand from 400 high school graduates in Jakarta who did not want to attended Universiteit Indonesia of the Dutch colonial government, PMIK announced the opening of a National Academy comprising five faculties: Social Studies, Economics and Politics; Biology, Mathematics and Physics, Letters, and English Literature.

The term academy, rather than university was chosen to avoid colonial words during the Indonesian war of independence. Lectures began on October 15, 1949. On December 22, 1949, the Ministry of Education and Culture, then located in Yogyakarta, provided full recognition for the National Academy.

On 1 September 1954 through a deed by Mr. R. Soewandi, the National Academy was renamed the National University. For its support during the war of independence, in 1959, Indonesia's first president, Sukarno, bestowed the title "University Of Struggle" (Universitas Perjuangan).

Campuses

Pasar Minggu
 
Campus at Pasar Minggu, located in South Jakarta, is the main campus, with faculties intended for undergraduate students.

Bambu Kuning 
Serves as a laboratory.

UNAS Tower 
A secondary campus, focussing mainly on graduate students.

Academies

Studies 
The National University is organized into several schools and academies, each with a dean/director.  https://www.unas.ac.id/program-studi/

Faculties
 Faculty of Social Science and Political Science
 Political Science
 International Relations
 Public Administration
 Sociology Science
 Communication Science
 Faculty of Economics and Business 
 Management
 Accounting
 Tourism
 Faculty of Language and Literature
 English literature
 Indonesian literature
 Japanese Literature
 Korean language
 Faculty of Law
 Law
 Faculty of Engineering and Sciences
 Physics
 Electrical Engineering
 Machine Engineering
 Physical Engineering
 Faculty of Biology
 Biology
 Faculty of Health Sciences
 Nursing Science
 Midwife Educator
 Nurse Professional Education
 Midwife Professional Education
 Faculty of Agriculture
  	Agriculture

 Faculty of Information and Technology

 Information System  
 Computer Science Informatics

Graduate school
Master of Political Science
 Master of Management
 Master of Public Administration
 Master of Law
 Master of Biology
 Master of Information Technology
 Doctor of Political Science

Alumni 
UNAS has alumni including politicians, government officials, scientific experts, researchers, business professionals, artists and entrepreneurs. They include Manuel Kaisiepo and Syaifullah Yusuf both are former State Minister for Acceleration of Development of Disadvantaged Regions; Agus Suparmanto former State Minister of Trade; Muhammad Hanif Dhakiri former State Minister of Manpower; Mochtar Kusumaatmaja. former State Minister of Foreign Affairs; Former Indonesian ambassador to Malaysia, Hadi Wayarabi and Ukraine, Yuddy Chrisnadi. Then alumni who became the first Doctor of Political Sciences in Indonesia, namely Prof. Dr. Deliar Noer. Alumni who become experts, namely Doctor of biological sciences. Endang Suhara, APU, and Dr. M. Kasim Moosa, APU. Expert researcher in Indonesian Institute of Sciences, Dr. Sharif Hidayat, APU, Syamsuddin Haris, M. Si, APU. There are alumni who work as artists and comedians such as Ateng, Jimmy Gideon or Unang as well as many other figures.

Notes

External links 
 
National University Faculty of Law
National University  Faculty of Language and Letters
National University  Faculty of Biology
National University  Graduate School

South Jakarta
Universities in Jakarta
Private universities and colleges in Jakarta
Educational institutions established in 1949
1949 establishments in Indonesia